The Catholic Church in Japan is part of the worldwide Catholic Church, under the spiritual leadership of the pope in Rome. As of 2021, there were approximately 431,100 Catholics in Japan (0.34% of the total population), 6,200 of whom are clerics, religious and seminarians. Japan has 16 dioceses, including three metropolitan archdioceses, with 34 bishops, 1,235 priests, and 40 deacons spread out across 957 churches (parishes, quasi-parishes, mission stations, and assembly centres).

The bishops of the dioceses form the Catholic Bishops' Conference of Japan, the episcopal conference of the nation. The main liturgical rites employed in Japan are those of the Latin Church.

The current apostolic nuncio, who serves as the Holy See's diplomatic ambassador and delegate to the local church in Japan, is Archbishop Leo Boccardi.

Christianity was introduced to Japan by the Jesuits, such as the Spaniard St. Francis Xavier and the Italian Alessandro Valignano. Portuguese Catholics founded the port of Nagasaki, considered at its founding to be an important Christian center in the Far East, though this distinction is now obsolete. There is a modern Japanese translation of the whole Bible by Federico Barbaro, an Italian missionary. Nowadays, many Japanese Catholics are ethnic Japanese from Brazil and Peru and naturalized Filipino Japanese.

The Personal Ordinariate of Our Lady of the Southern Cross, a personal ordinariate within the Catholic Church originally created as a means for Anglicans to enter communion with Rome while maintaining their patrimony, has also begun to form in Japan. As of 2015, it has two congregations.

History

Organisation

Governance

The Catholic Bishops' Conference of Japan is the Japanese episcopal conference, which serves as the main decision-making body of the Church in Japan. The current President of the CBCJ is Isao Kikuchi.

The Catholic Church in Japan is divided into three ecclesiastical provinces with a total of 16 dioceses, three of which are metropolitan archdioceses. Japan has no military ordinariate compared with its neighbour South Korea. However, it does share a personal ordinariate with two other countries, Australia and the Philippines.

Ecclesiastical territories 
The Catholic Church in Japan is organised into 16 dioceses, 3 of which are classified as metropolitan dioceses that head each of the 3 ecclesiastical provinces in the country.

Dioceses by region

Ecclesiastical Province of Nagasaki
Metropolitan Archdiocese of Nagasaki
Diocese of Fukuoka
Diocese of Kagoshima
Diocese of Naha
Diocese of Oita

Ecclesiastical Province of Osaka
Metropolitan Archdiocese of Osaka
Diocese of Hiroshima
Diocese of Kyoto
Diocese of Nagoya
Diocese of Takamatsu

Ecclesiastical Province of Tokyo
Metropolitan Archdiocese of Tokyo
Diocese of Niigata
Diocese of Saitama
Diocese of Sapporo
Diocese of Sendai
Diocese of Yokohama

Personal Ordinariate 

 Personal Ordinariate of Our Lady of the Southern Cross

Catholic education in Japan 
The Catholic Church is involved in religious education in Japan, providing learning opportunities to both Catholic and non-Catholic students. According to the Catholic Bishops' Conference of Japan, Japan has a total of 828 Catholic educational institutions. The Church operates different types of schools, which can be seen below:

The Jesuit Sophia University in Chiyoda, Tokyo is listed in the Times Higher Education and QS Global University rankings, and is considered one of the top private universities in Japan. It is one of 37 universities selected by the Japanese Government to participate in the Top Global University Project and receive financial assistance to boost globalisation in Japan and foster research.

Other Catholic universities in Japan include Nanzan University (Nagoya, Aichi) and the Elisabeth University of Music (Hiroshima, Hiroshima).

Martyrs and canonised saints 

Founded in 1986, the Committee for Promoting Canonisation, which is directly affiliated with the Standing Committee of the Catholic Bishops' Conference of Japan, is responsible for promoting Japan's canonisation efforts and recognition of its martyrs. Its main objectives are to support local dioceses in promoting cases for canonisation, support canonisation promoted by the Conference, and promotion devotions to Japanese Catholic martyrs.

All Catholic martyrs in Japan, both native Japanese and foreign missionaries, were persecuted and killed during the Sakoku period of Japanese isolationism. Some of the groups of martyrs and individual martyrs were later canonised and venerated as saints in the Church's liturgical calendar.

Canonised saints 

 Twenty-Six Martyrs of Japan (also called St Paul Miki and Companions)
 Paul Miki (one of the Twenty-Six Martyrs)
 Sixteen Martyrs of Japan

Martyrs

Worship 

There are some minor differences between the mass in Japan and the mass in other countries.  For example, before Communion, most languages quote from the centurion of Matthew 8 ("Lord, I am not worthy that you should enter under my roof, but only say the word and my soul shall be healed").  In Japanese, however, the saying is 「主よ、あなたは神の子キリスト、永遠の命の糧、あなたをおいてだれのところへ行きましょう」 (Rōmaji : omo yo, anata wa kami no ko Kirisuto, eien no inochi no kate, anata o oite dare no tokoro e ikimashō; English: "Lord, you are the Christ, the Son of God, the bread of eternal life, to whom shall I leave thee?"), taken from quotes of Simon Peter in John 6 and Matthew 16.

Papal visits 

 Pope John Paul II (1981) became the first pontiff to visit Japan. He had gone to the atomic bomb memorial sites in Hiroshima and Nagasaki.
 Pope Francis (November 2019) visited Japan for the first in decades. He visited former Prime Minister Shinzo Abe, Emperor Naruhito at the Tokyo Imperial Palace, Sophia University, and the Nagasaki Atomic Bomb Hypocenter Park.

See also

Christianity in Japan
List of Saints from Asia
Kirishitan
History of the Catholic Church in Japan
Tarō Asō
Martyrdom of the 26 Saints of Japan
Lorenzo Ruiz
Silence, the acclaimed historical novel by Shūsaku Endō drawn from the oral histories of the "Hidden Christian" communities (Kakure Kirishitan and Hanare Kirishitan) that survived the 17th century state suppression of the Catholic Church in Japan.
Domingos Chohachi Nakamura, the 1st Japanese missionary to work abroad, he emigrated to Brazil in 1923 to work on behalf of the Japanese living there. His process of beatification started in 2002.
Our Lady of Akita

References

External links
GCatholic.org on the Catholic Church in Japan
Catholic Bishops' Conference of Japan
Catholic churches in Japan

 
Japan
Japan
Catholicism in Japan